HMS M4 was an M-class submarine of the Royal Navy built by Armstrong Whitworth, Newcastle Upon Tyne, and laid down in 1917. M4 was cancelled and sold as an incomplete hulk on 30 November 1921.

References 
 
 

 

British M-class submarines
Ships built on the River Tyne
World War I submarines of the United Kingdom
Ships built by Armstrong Whitworth
1919 ships